Tina Acketoft (born 19 March 1966 in Kokkola, Finland), is a Swedish Liberal People's Party politician. She is a member of the Riksdag, replacing Torkild Strandberg on 11 January 2007. Acketoft was previously a member from 2002 to 2006.

References

External links
 Tina Acketoft at the Riksdag website

1966 births
21st-century Swedish women politicians
Living people
Members of the Riksdag 2002–2006
Members of the Riksdag 2006–2010
Members of the Riksdag 2010–2014
Members of the Riksdag 2014–2018
Members of the Riksdag 2018–2022
Members of the Riksdag from the Liberals (Sweden)
Women members of the Riksdag
People from Kokkola